Coskata (also Coskaty, Cross Katy, or Koskata Head) is a village in Nantucket, Massachusetts, United States.  Its elevation is 3 feet (1 m), and it is located at  (41.3542871, -70.0202925), 2 miles (3 km) northwest of Wauwinet.

References

Villages in Nantucket, Massachusetts
Villages in Massachusetts
Populated coastal places in Massachusetts